The Indian Civil Accounts Service(ICAS)(Hindi: भारतीय सिविल लेखा सेवा Bharatiya Civil Lekha Seva ) is one of the Civil Services of India ("Group A"). ICAS is under the Department of Expenditure in the Union Ministry of Finance. The service was created in 1976 with the purpose of separating Auditing and Accounting functions of the Union Government with  deputation and transfer from Indian Audit and Accounts Department. Since 1977, personnel are selected from the Civil Services Examination conducted by Union Public Service Commission, like all other Central Civil Services.

Profile
The Indian Civil Accounts Organization performs a key role in delivery of financial management services for the Government of India. The organization provides payment services, supports the tax collection system, performs government-wide accounting, financial reporting functions and carries out internal audit in civil ministries of the Union Government. Controller General of Accounts (CGA) in Ministry of Finance heads the organization and is responsible for administering this system.
The organization has been leveraging information technology for delivery of these services in consonance with the constantly changing technological environment and increasing ICT penetration in the country. The goal is to provide reliable information that brings transparency in the use and reporting of public funds through an integrated government financial management system(PFMS).ICAS administers crucial Government payment system through PFMS and also responsible providing platforms for Direct Cash Transfers to all the Government agencies.

Training
Officers of ICAS are trained in three stages. For the first 6 months, they are trained at National Institute of Financial Management (NIFM), Faridabad along with officers of Indian Defence Accounts Services, Indian Postal-Telecom Accounts and Finance Services.

After NIFM training, the ICAS officers are attached to the Institute of Government Accounts and Finance [INGAF]. In their third stage of training, ICAS officers are sent for On-The-Job-Training (OJT) from INGAF.

Organizational structure 
Indian Civil Accounts Organization is headed by Controller General of Accounts (CGA) in the Department of Expenditure, Ministry of Finance. CGA as the central accounting and reporting agency for Government of India and is assisted by officers of Indian Civil Accounts Service.

As per the Departmentalised accounting arrangements in government, operational responsibility for accounting, reporting and internal audit function in civil ministries is with the ICAS officers. These units are headed by the Principal Chief Controller of Accounts (Pr. CCA), Chief Controller of Accounts (CCA) or a Controller of Accounts (CA) in the respective ministries. Under the overall supervision of CGA, they assist the Secretary of the Ministry who is the chief accounting authority in the ministry. The Pr.CCAs / CCAs / CAs discharge their duties and responsibilities through the Principal Accounts Office (Pr. AO) at Ministry's headquarters and Pay and Accounts Offices (PAOs) at the field formation level. There are currently 358 PAOs located at 87 stations across the country.

Administration 
The cadre management of Group 'A' officers of the Indian Civil Accounts Service (ICAS) vests with the Controller General of Accounts. It covers the entire gamut of personnel management of ICAS officers, both within the country as well as abroad, and periodical reviews of cadre strength and distribution.

References

https://cga.nic.in/writereaddata/Profilel_ICAS.pdf

External links
 Official Website of CGA's Office
 Official Website of INGAF
 Official Website for CPSMS
 Organisation Structure

Accounting in India
Central Civil Services (India)